Mokkapati Narasimha Sastry (1892–1973) was an Indian novelist who wrote in the Telugu language. He is best known for the 1924 comedy novel, Barrister Parvateesam.
Sastry has written many plays, short stories and essays besides his great work ‘Barrister Parvateesam’, though his name is generally associated with it.

Sastry was skilled in multiple genres, but had a penchant for humour. It is the spirit of humour, in fact, that pervades the entire works of Sastry.

There are six plays of his collected in one volume. Some of them bear traces of European descent, though all of them maintain the distinct touch of Sastry.

‘Mrokkubadi’ is a short one act play based on the belief that one can overcome any illness or danger by solemnly taking a vow to please the deity Venkateswara by offering to him everything possible.

'Abhyudayam’ (Progress), another Sastry play, is similar to 'Mrokkubadi' in focusing our attention on the conflict between humanism. This play was composed in 1940 and the Great War provided the necessary impetus.

‘Pedda Mamayya’ is a play where we breathe the fresh air of romance, love, awe, and humour.

Equally humorous is the ‘Asadharana Samavesamu’ (The Extraordinary Meeting). This is yet another social satire breathing light humour and portraying the typical modern
associations that dream of doing great things.

'Varasatvam’ deals with the longing for a legacy. Dissatisfaction with what one has, goads the young Venkatarao to quarrel with his wife whose unmarried uncle has acquired a huge fortune.

'Pativratyam’ is a short play dealing with the troubles of a young man brought up on modern lines. Here the conflict between the western and oriental civilizations is well depicted.

References 

1892 births
1973 deaths
Telugu writers
Novelists from Andhra Pradesh
20th-century Indian novelists